Bias-free communication is speech or writing that attempts to include people of all ethnicities, gender identities, sexual orientations, religious affiliations, abilities, and ages by communicating in a way that makes no assumptions about the receiver of such communication.

An important part of communicating in a bias-free manner is by making sure you are engaging in meaningful conversations, using bias-free language. The writer's word choice is vital in terms of effectively communicating in ways that do not offend the receiver. According to Locker, "Bias-free language is language that is sensitive to people's sex, race, age, physical condition and many other categories. Bias-free language does not discriminate and therefore includes all readers in a fair and friendly manner."

Identifying Bias 
Bias exists everywhere, even if it is not always acknowledged. If a verbal or written communication includes any of the following, it may be bias:
 Unsupported claims.
 Extreme or inappropriate language.
 For written text, there may be no clear author.
 Spoken communication may have a speaker with a poor reputation.
These sources should be questioned for their bias because it could impact their validity in their points. Therefore, avoiding bias in all communication will ensure that the point is crystal clear and the speaker is trusted.

Practicing Bias-free Communication 
By practicing bias-free communication it takes away any prejudice that may be implied. This prejudice is often linked to preexisting oppression in society, and may not always be acknowledged at fist glance. Communication, written or spoken, is extremely important in making connections and demonstrating thoughts. Using bias-free language is especially important in the workplace. Educators should avoid using bias because it is impossible to know every students background, and therefore, educators may cause damage to students self-image. If a job included writing and sending mass emails the writer should take caution when writing because the readers may have different lived experiences than the author. By taking out any bias it allows for all parties to focus on the intended message rather than attempting to sift through bias, intentional or otherwise. Below are some examples that can be implemented easily:

See also 
Inclusive language
Communication rights
Stereotypes

References

Human communication
Ageism
Multiculturalism
Interpersonal communication